Prescott Lecky (November 1, 1892 – May 30, 1941) was a lecturer of Psychology at Columbia University from 1924 to 1934.  At a time when American  psychology was dominated by behaviorism, he  developed the concept of self-help as a method in  psychotherapy of the self in the 1920s. His  concepts influenced Maxwell Maltz in his writing of the  classic self-help book, Psycho-Cybernetics. George Kelly, in his book The Psychology of Personal Constructs, also credits Lecky as an influence. Lecky stressed the defense mechanism of  resistance as an individual's  method of  regulating his self-concept.

Lecky's self-consistency theory is that self-consistency is a primary motivating force in human behavior.  Lecky's theory concerned  the organization of ideas of the self and the self's overall need for a "master"  motive that serves to maintain for the self a consistency in ideas. Self-consistency theory  remains relevant to contemporary personality and clinical psychologists. He was well known as a psychologist and counseled John F. Kennedy when he was having trouble at Choate preparatory school.

His students gathered together his ideas and posthumously published them  as Self Consistency: a theory of personality in 1945.

Lecky was born in Virginia and died in New York City. He's buried at Hollywood Cemetery in
Richmond, Virginia.

See also
Self-concept

Footnotes

20th-century American psychologists
1892 births
1941 deaths
Columbia University faculty